Idlette is a surname. Notable people with the surname include:

Lavonne Idlette (born 1985), Dominican Republic hurdler
Patricia Idlette, American actress who also worked in Canada